Barmer Medical College is a full-fledged tertiary Medical college in Barmer, Rajasthan, India. It was established in the year 2019. The college imparts the degree of Bachelor of Medicine and Surgery (MBBS). Nursing and para-medical courses are also offered. The college is affiliated to Rajasthan University of Health Sciences and is recognized by Medical Council of India. The selection to the college is done on the basis of merit through National Eligibility and Entrance Test.The college has started MBBS courses from August 2019.

Courses
Barmer Medical College undertakes the education and training of students MBBS courses.

References

External links 
 https://education.rajasthan.gov.in/content/raj/education/barmer-medical-college/en/home.html#

2019 establishments in Rajasthan
Affiliates of Rajasthan University of Health Sciences
Educational institutions established in 2019
Medical colleges in Rajasthan